German submarine U-439 was a Type VIIC U-boat of Nazi Germany's Kriegsmarine during World War II.

She carried out four patrols. She sank no ships.

She was a member of six wolfpacks.

She was sunk after a collision with another U-boat on 4 May 1943.

Design
German Type VIIC submarines were preceded by the shorter Type VIIB submarines. U-439 had a displacement of  when at the surface and  while submerged. She had two shafts and two  propellers.

U-439 was fitted with five  torpedo tubes (four fitted at the bow and one at the stern), fourteen torpedoes, one  SK C/35 naval gun, 220 rounds, and a  C/30 anti-aircraft gun. The boat had a complement of between forty-four and sixty.

Service history
The submarine was laid down on 1 October 1940 at Schichau-Werke in Danzig (now Gdansk, Poland) as yard number 1490, launched on 11 October 1941 and commissioned on 20 December under the command of Oberleutnant zur See Wolfgang Sporn.

She served with the 5th U-boat Flotilla from 20 December 1941 for training and the 1st flotilla from 1 November 1942 for operations.

First patrol
U-439s first patrol was from Kiel in Germany. She headed for the Atlantic Ocean, via the gap separating the Faroe and Shetland Islands. She arrived at Brest in occupied France on 24 December.

Second and third patrols
For her second sortie, she barely got out of the Bay of Biscay.

Her third foray took her into the middle of the North Atlantic.

Fourth patrol and loss
Both boats sank.

Forty men went down with U-439; there were nine survivors.

Wolfpacks
U-439 took part in six wolfpacks, namely:
 Panzer (23 November – 11 December 1942) 
 Raufbold (11 – 15 December 1942) 
 Neuland (4 – 6 March 1943) 
 Ostmark (6 – 11 March 1943) 
 Stürmer (11 – 19 March 1943) 
 Drossel (29 April – 4 May 1943)

References

Bibliography

External links

German Type VIIC submarines
U-boats commissioned in 1941
U-boats sunk in 1943
U-boats sunk in collisions
1941 ships
Ships built in Danzig
World War II submarines of Germany
World War II shipwrecks in the Atlantic Ocean
Maritime incidents in May 1943
Ships built by Schichau